Martin Kramarič (born 14 November 1997) is a Slovenian footballer who plays as a winger for Slovenian PrvaLiga club Bravo. 

With over 150 appearances in Slovenian PrvaLiga, he made his senior debut for Krka in 2014, and became the league's youngest ever goalscorer at the age of 16 in the same year. He also represented Maribor, Krško and Bravo.

Club career
Born in Novo Mesto, Kramarič began his career at hometown club Krka. He made his professional debut in the Slovenian PrvaLiga on 22 March 2014, starting and playing for 81 minutes in a 3–1 loss against Maribor. On 12 April, he opened the scoring in a 1–1 home draw with Rudar Velenje; at the age of 16 years, 4 months and 29 days, he became the all-time youngest goalscorer in the league.

On 31 August 2014, Kramarič and teammate Matko Obradović moved to Maribor on a three-year contracts. In 55 total games for the club in all competitions, he scored once, opening a 5–1 win at Ankaran in the second minute of the match on 6 August 2017. After loans to fellow top-flight teams Krško and Bravo, he signed a permanent deal with the latter on 25 September 2020.

In 2021–22, Kramarič scored twice in the Slovenian Football Cup, including in the 3–2 home semi-final win over Domžale on 20 April, as his team finished as runners-up. On 9 October 2022, he scored his first career hat-trick in a 6–1 home win over city rivals Olimpija Ljubljana.

Notes

References

External links
NZS profile 

1997 births
Living people
Sportspeople from Novo Mesto
Slovenian footballers
Association football wingers
NK Krka players
NK Maribor players
NK Krško players
NK Bravo players
Slovenian PrvaLiga players
Slovenia youth international footballers
Slovenia under-21 international footballers